Baldwin is a village in St. Croix County, Wisconsin, United States. The population was 3,957 at the 2010 census, a growth rate of 48% from 2000. The village is adjacent to the Town of Baldwin.

History

Dana Reed Bailey founded Baldwin in 1871. First known as "Clarksville" after its railroad depot, it was renamed Baldwin after the manager of the Western Wisconsin Railroad, D. A. Baldwin, who was responsible for the railroad through the town.

Geography
Baldwin is located at  (44.964401, -92.373251).

Demographics

2010 census
At the 2010 census Baldwin had 3,957 people, 1,572 households, and 1,006 families. The racial makup of the village was 96.0% White, 0.9% African American, 0.4% Native American, 0.6% Asian, 0.6% from other races, and 1.6% from two or more races. Hispanic or Latino of any race were 1.6%.

Of the 1,572 households 37.0% had children under the age of 18, 51.7% were married couples living together, 7.8% had a female householder with no husband present, 4.5% had a male householder with no wife present, and 36.0% were non-families. 28.9% of households were one person and 12.1% were one person aged 65 or older. The average household size was 2.48 and the average family size was 3.09.

The age distribution was 24.1% under the age of 18, 10.0% from 18 to 24, 29.0% from 25 to 44, 18.0% from 45 to 64, and 18.9% 65 or older. The median age was 35 years. The female:male ratio was 100:90.9. For every 100 females age 18 and over, the village had 89.3 males.

The median household income was $40,313 and the median family income was $51,250. Males had a median income of $37,216 versus $26,250 for females. The per capita income for the village was $20,748. About 3.0% of families and 5.5% of the population were below the poverty line, including 3.0% of those under age 18 and 5.6% of those age 65 or over.

Education

There are three public schools in the Baldwin Woodville School District. Greenfield Elementary School and Baldwin-Woodville High School are in Baldwin, and Viking Middle School is in Woodville.

Notable people
 Hans A. Aune, Wisconsin state representative, businessman, and educator, born in Baldwin
 Raymond A. Peabody, Wisconsin state representative and businessman, born in Baldwin
 James Patrick Powers, Roman Catholic bishop of the Diocese of Superior, born in Baldwin

See also
 List of villages in Wisconsin

References

External links

 
 Baldwin Bulletin
 Baldwin Woodville Chamber of Commerce
 Sanborn fire insurance maps: 1902 1912

Villages in St. Croix County, Wisconsin
Villages in Wisconsin